Transmembrane protein 175, or TMEM175, is a transmembrane protein that is thought to be an endolysosomal potassium channel. It is predicted to have many orthologs across eukaryotes.

Expression
Based on human and mouse EST profiles and a human tissue GEO profile, TMEM175 appears to be expressed at a relatively high level(75-98%) in normal tissues.  TMEM175 appears to be down regulated in stage three ovarian cancer

Homology
Transmembrane protein 175 has no paralogs.  It does have orthologs within eukaryotes.  The following table presents some of the orthologs found using searches in BLAST and BLAT.  This list does not contain all of the orthologs for TMEM175.  It is meant to display the diversity of species for which orthologs are found.

Predicted Post-Translational Modification
Using various tools at ExPASy the following are possible post-translational modifications for TMEM175.
5 possible CK2 phosphorylation sites 
2 possible PKC phosphorylation sites
N-myristoylation sites around transmembrane regions
The N-myristoylation sites are conserved in vertebrates.

References